Street of Chance may refer to:

 Street of Chance (1930 film)
 Street of Chance (1942 film)